Jack White's Inn is a pub and restaurant in Brittas Bay, County Wicklow in Ireland. It is located on N11 road, in a zone where the Irish smuggler and pirate Jack White used to operate, in the coast denominated Jack Moloney's Hole.

History

Jack White’s hole 
The pub's name is a reference to Jack White, an Irish pirate that lived at the turn of the 18th century, reputed to be a first class smuggler. Jack White arranged shipment of Wicklow wool to be sent abroad to France in exchange for brandy, wine and French luxury goods. He operated in a place so called ‘Jack’s Hole’, where now Jack White's Inn is located, in Brittas Bay. After a falling out occurred over a particularly rich cargo of clandestine goods, Jack White was tried by some of his regular clients -high class gentlemen- and sentenced to death. There is a reputed copy of an arrest warrant on the wall of Jack White's Inn.

Tom Nevin’s murder 

In 1996, Jack White's Inn was the scene of one of the most famous Irish murders. On 16 March of that year Tom Nevin, co-owner of the pub, was shot dead while counting the takings of the Bank Holiday Weekend. In a supposed botched robbery attempt, he was killed by a single shotgun blast. 
Catherine Nevin, Tom Nevin's wife and also owner of the pub, was suspected of having hired three men to murder her husband. She was tried by a jury of six men and six women, and found guilty on 11 April 2000, after five days of deliberation, "a record in Irish legal history". She was convicted for the murder and for soliciting three men (William McClean, Gerry Heapes and John Jones) to contract kill her husband. She maintained her innocence and had appealed on several occasions, without succeeding.

Revival 
The restaurant and pub remained closed for some time before the murder of Tom Nevin. In January 1998, Catherine Nevin sold the pub. In 2003, Tadhg and Clare Kennedy -the current owners- purchased the property and recovered the pub's attendance.

References

Pubs in the Republic of Ireland
Buildings and structures in County Wicklow